Partridge Lake is a lake located in Waupaca County, Wisconsin. The Wolf River is the primary source for the lake, with the Little River and the Walla Walla Creek also emptying into the lake. The village of Fremont lies on the south shore.

See also
 List of lakes of Wisconsin

References

Lakes of Wisconsin